Ricardo Mello did not defend his 2009 title, losing to eventual champion Tatsuma Ito in the semifinals.
Ito, the 261st ranked player in the world as of August 2, 2010, defeated Izak van der Merwe 6–4, 6–4 in the final.

Seeds

Draw

Finals

Top half

Bottom half

References

 Official site
 Main Draw
 Qualifying Draw

Aberto de Brasilia - Singles
Aberto de Brasília